Glyphodes cyanomichla is a moth of the family Crambidae described by Frederic Moore in 1888. It is found in the Bengal region and in Taiwan.

This species has a wingspan of 37 mm.

References

External links
Flickr image

Moths described in 1888
Glyphodes